Jean-Louis Cottigny (born 12 September 1950 in Hesdin, Pas-de-Calais) is a French politician and Member of the European Parliament for the north-west of France. He is a member of the Socialist Party, which is part of the Party of European Socialists, and sits on the European Parliament's Committee on Employment and Social Affairs.

He is also a substitute for the Committee on Transport and Tourism and a member of the delegation for relations with the countries of Central America.

Career
 Worker, then regional assistant (1970–1989)
 Former Chairman of the Arras Industrial Tribunal
 Federal Secretary of the Pas-de-Calais Socialist Party, with responsibility for businesses (1974–1990)
 Socialist Party national secretary with responsibility for businesses (1990–1997)
 Mayor of Beaurains (1989–2004)
 Member of the Pas-de-Calais Departmental Council (1989–2004)
 Member of the European Parliament (1997–1999)
 Knight of the Legion of Honour

External links
 European Parliament biography

1950 births
Living people
MEPs for North-West France 2004–2009
Socialist Party (France) MEPs